The 1898 Nebraska gubernatorial election was held on November 8, 1898.

Incumbent Populist Governor Silas A. Holcomb did not stand for re-election.

Populist and Democratic fusion nominee William A. Poynter defeated Republican nominee Monroe Hayward with 50.19% of the vote.

General election

Candidates
Major party candidates
William A. Poynter, People's Independent, Democratic and Silver Republican fusion candidate, former President Pro Tempore of the Nebraska Senate, Populist candidate for Nebraska's 3rd congressional district in 1892. The Democratic state convention first nominated Constantine Joseph Smyth, who declined the nomination, then Edgar Howard, before nominating Poynter who had already been nominated by the Populist and Silver Republican parties.
Monroe Hayward, Republican, former district court judge

Other candidates
R. V. Muir, Prohibition
Dr. H. S. Aley, Socialist Labor

Results

References

1898
Nebraska
Gubernatorial